A WikiProject, or Wikiproject, is an affinity group for contributors with shared goals within the Wikimedia movement. WikiProjects are prevalent within the largest wiki, Wikipedia, and exist to varying degrees within sibling projects such as Wiktionary, Wikiquote, Wikidata, and Wikisource. They also exist in different languages, and translation of articles is a form of their collaboration.

During the COVID-19 pandemic, CBS News noted the role of Wikipedia's WikiProject Medicine in maintaining the accuracy of articles related to the disease. Another WikiProject that has drawn attention is WikiProject Women Scientists, which was profiled by Smithsonian for its efforts to improve coverage of women scientists which the profile noted had "helped increase the number of female scientists on Wikipedia from around 1,600 to over 5,000".

On Wikipedia
Some Wikipedia WikiProjects are substantial enough to engage in cooperative activities with outside organizations relevant to the field at issue. For example, in 2014 Cochrane announced that it had entered into a partnership with Wikipedia's WikiProject Medicine, "to support sharing relevant Cochrane Evidence in Wikipedia’s health articles and to develop strategies to keep Wikipedia’s health-related content up to date, unbiased, and of high quality."

Wikipedia has thousands of WikiProjects, primarily divided between specific topical areas and performing specific maintenance tasks. One task commonly performed by topical WikiProjects on Wikipedia is the assessment of the quality of articles that fall within that topic area. In Wikipedia and sibling projects, WikiProject pages are located in project space, and the meta information regarding the association between the article and the WikiProject is usually included on the talk page of the article.

WikiProjects provide an additional avenue for engagement between editors with similar interests, and have thereby been found to increase the productivity of such editors. In order to spur participation and concentrate effectiveness, WikiProjects on Wikipedia may engage in activities like having a "collaboration of the week", or designating one article to be improved to the point of achieving "featured" status. The WikiProject Council is a group of editors that assists with the development of active WikiProjects, and acts as a central point for inter-WikiProject discussion and collaboration.

A 2008 academic study of Wikipedia concluded that participation in WikiProjects substantially improved the chances of an editor becoming an administrator, finding that one Wikipedia policy edit or WikiProject edit is worth ten article edits, and concluding:

WikiProjects and assessments of article importance and quality

In 2007, the English Wikipedia introduced an assessment scale of the quality of articles. Articles are rated by WikiProjects. The range of quality classes begins with "Stub" (very short pages), followed by "Start", "C" and "B" (in increasing order of quality). Community peer review is needed for the article to enter one of the highest quality classes: either "A", "good article" or the highest, "featured article". Of the about 4.4 million articles and lists assessed as of March 2015, about 7,000 (0.16%) are a featured article or a featured list. One featured article per day, as selected by editors, appears on the main page of Wikipedia. According to research in 2021, WikiProject Tropical Cyclones has the most quality content in terms of good articles and featured articles. This is unusual, due to the project's narrow scope and member count of only around 100.

The articles can also be rated for importance by WikiProjects. Currently, there are 5 importance categories: "low", "mid", "high", "top", and "???" for unclassified/unsure level. For a particular article, different WikiProjects may assign different importance levels.

The Wikipedia Version 1.0 Editorial Team has developed a table (shown below) that displays data of all rated articles by quality and importance, on the English Wikipedia. If an article or list receives different ratings by two or more WikiProjects, then the highest rating is used in the table and bar-chart.

Researcher Giacomo Poderi found that articles tend to reach featured status via the intensive work of a few editors. A 2010 study found unevenness in quality among featured articles and concluded that the community process is ineffective in assessing the quality of articles.

WikiProject Medicine

WikiProject Medicine, formed in 2004, is a Wikipedia WikiProject dedicated to improving coverage of medicine-related topics. It has over 200 active volunteers, including James Heilman. About half of the volunteers are health care professionals or students. The project has established contacts with organizations such as World Health Organization, National Institutes of Health, United States National Library of Medicine, and Cancer Research UK, and succeeded in creating several Wikipedian in residence programs at medical institutions.

A 2011 review of the project efforts praised it for assessing the vast majority of medical articles on Wikipedia (at that time about 25,000), at the same time remarking that only around 70 have been assessed as high quality. The reviewer also suggested improvements to the Wikipedia system, such as making article assessment more prominent to the readers, and requesting that reviewers leave notes on how to improve low quality articles. In 2012, a dedicated American NGO, Wiki Project Med Foundation (WPMEDF), was formed to support it. A 2016 review noted that the number of high quality articles has improved to about 80, noting that one of them (on dengue fever) was even formatted and republished in a peer reviewed journal. The review praised the efforts of the volunteers, but noted that participation levels are too low to promise any significant improvements in the thousands of lower-quality articles, calling for more medical practitioners to volunteer their time on Wikipedia. Regarding the quality of articles, the review also pointed that readability (complexity) of Wikipedia articles may be too high for its intended audience, and encouraged the Wikipedia volunteers to review this aspect.

WikiProject Medicine during the COVID-19 pandemic
CBS News described the role of Wikipedia's WikiProject Medicine in making Wikipedia a source of medical information relating to the COVID-19 pandemic, noting that a project member "edits and reviews all the medical content on Wikipedia", but also providing the caveat that "even though medical pages are strictly monitored by the WikiProject team, and hot topics that get a lot of page views are carefully edited, inaccurate information persists on some of Wikipedia's less-read pages".

References

Wikipedia
Wiki concepts